The Canadian Centre for Diversity and Inclusion  is a national charitable organization with the mandate to help the individuals and organizations they work with be inclusive, and free of prejudice and discrimination – and to generate the awareness, dialogue and action for people to recognize diversity as an asset and not an obstacle. It was formed in 2014.

History 
CCDI is a merger of two organizations - the Canadian Institute of Diversity and Inclusion (CIDI) and the Canadian Centre for Diversity (CCDI) - that took place in 2014. The merger was initiated because CCDI had announced they were shutting their doors due to funding issues. To allow the CCDI's programs to continue, the CIDI and CCDI entered into a dialogue about a merger which would provide stable funding.

About the Canadian Centre for Diversity (CCDI) 
The Canadian Centre for Diversity (originally called the Canadian Council for Christians and Jews) was founded in 1947 to address issues of antisemitism and promote interfaith dialogue. The mandate expanded in subsequent years to focus on addressing issues related to racism, and religious discrimination in Canadian society. Their primary focus was on providing school programs to educate students on issues related to bullying, bias, and discrimination. The CCCJ changed its name in 2008 to the Canadian Centre for Diversity to be more reflective of its broader mandate.

In September 2013, the board of directors of the CCDI announced that it was shutting its doors due to a lack of ongoing funding. Subsequently, CCDI announced in January 2014 that they would merge with the Canadian Institute of Diversity and Inclusion.

About the Canadian Institute of Diversity and Inclusion (CIDI) 
CIDI was founded in 2012 by Michael Bach, the former National Director of Diversity, Equity, and Inclusion for KPMG in Canada, a role he created and held for seven years. Having worked as a diversity and inclusion practitioner for the better part of a decade - both in Canada and globally as the Deputy Chief Diversity Officer for KPMG International - Bach felt there was a need for an organization that could wrap its arms around the entire diversity conversation and provide some unity and clarity to what had become a very complicated topic.

Bach's vision was to create a non-profit organization that would support employers along their diversity and inclusion journey. CIDI officially launched in 2012. By the middle of 2013 CIDI had secured its founding employer partners, had a staff of five, and was operating in four cities across Canada.

Merger talks began between the two organizations at the end of 2013. There was an agreement in principle struck and Bach was named the CEO of CCDI to facilitate the merger over the course of 2014. The merger officially took place in 2015.

In July 2022, Anne-Marie Pham was named Chief Executive Officer of the Canadian Centre for Diversity and Inclusion. Michael Bach appointed Chair of the Board of Directors.

Awards of Success 

In an effort to recognize leaders in the area of diversity and inclusion, in 2016 CCDI launched the Awards of Success to acknowledge the contribution of three individuals who have gone above and beyond to promote diversity and inclusion.

The Awards of Success recognize three people in the following categories:
 Senior Executive of the Year
 Diversity and Inclusion Practitioner of the Year
 Community Contributor of the Year
In their first year, the awards went to Simon Fish, General Counsel, BMO Financial Group (Senior Executive of the Year), Normand St. Gelais, Director, Diversity & Inclusion, Sodexo (Diversity and Inclusion Practitioner of the Year), and Malinda Smith, Professor, University of Alberta.

Educational Campaigns 
CCDI has released several educational campaigns to raise awareness and inspire discussion on diversity and inclusion in Canada.

TalkingASL 
To help raise awareness of available resources related to American Sign Language (ASL, in French Langue des Signes Québécoise or LSQ) CCDI created TalkingASL.ca (in French ParlantLSQ.ca) - a free library of ASL related resources in Canada.

Sochi Olympics 
In view of the 2014 Olympic protests of Russian anti-gay laws, the (then) Canadian Institute of Diversity and Inclusion released a humorous public service announcement to draw attention to the ongoing anti-gay laws controversy coupled with the Olympics being held in Russia. In it the jest that the Games have always been a little gay, and should be kept that way.

Save Syria 
In response to the death of Alan Kurdi, a Syrian infant who drowned while his family was fleeing war-torn Syrian, CCDI issued a call to action to Canada's largest employers to contribute to help with the resettlement of Syrian refugees in Canada. They created the Save Syria campaign and the Syrian Refugee Relief Fund.

The fund raised over $200,000 and 100% of the funds go to support the resettlement of Syrian refugees in Canada who have been privately sponsored (as opposed to government-sponsored refugees).

#EndTheBan 
In an effort to raise awareness of the deferral against men who have sex with men (MSMs) from donating blood, CCDI produced a public service announcement referred to as "Gay Blood", and created the hashtag #EndTheBan. The objective was to point out that there is no such thing as "gay blood" and that the deferral against MSMs was not based on science, but on outdated information, and was ultimately discriminatory.

The PSA received significant attention and the result was that Canadian Blood Services reached out to CCDI to include them on the work to develop the research needed to remove the deferral entirely and move toward a behavioral based deferral. Further, CCDI played an influential role in securing the funding required to conduct the research which began in January 2017.

References 

Human rights organizations based in Canada